Fabi is an Italian surname. Notable people with this surname include:

 Claudio Fabi (born 1940), Italian record producer, composer, conductor, pianist and arranger
 Corrado Fabi (born 1961), Italian racing driver
 Manfred Fabi, Austrian curler
 Martin Fabi (1942–2023), Canadian professional football player
 Niccolò Fabi (born 1968), Italian singer-songwriter
 Randy Fabi (born 1963), Canadian professional football player
 Ricardo Peralta y Fabi (1950–2017), Mexican mechanical engineer 
 Teo Fabi (born 1955), Italian racing driver

Italian-language surnames